Acrokeratoelastoidosis of Costa is a familial condition characterized by multiple keratotic papules on the dorsum of the hands and feet, palms, soles, in which electron microscopy shows rarified, abnormal elastic tissue.

It was characterized in 1953.

Treatments such as liquid nitrogen, salicylic acid, tretinoin, and prednisone have been tried, though with limited success.

See also 
 Skin lesion
 List of cutaneous conditions

References

External links 

Palmoplantar keratodermas